Dream into Action is the second studio album by British pop musician Howard Jones. It was released in March 1985 and reached No. 2 in the UK Album Charts. The album also reached the top ten in the U.S. The album achieved a gold certification in the UK and platinum status in the US and Canada.

The album contains the hit singles "Things Can Only Get Better" (UK No. 6, US No. 5), "Look Mama" (UK No. 10) and "Life in One Day" (UK No. 14, US No. 19). Additionally, the track "No One Is to Blame" was re-recorded in a new arrangement for single release, reaching No. 16 in the UK and No. 4 in the US in 1986 and was included on a later second European pressing of the album. The 1984 single "Like to Get to Know You Well" (UK No. 4) was included on the album's CD reissue. A world tour accompanied the album's original release with Jones playing Wembley Arena and the O2 Academy Birmingham in the UK, and arena-size venues in the US, Europe and Japan. In 2010, a remastered edition of the album was issued alongside Jones' debut album Human's Lib.

Reception

Track listing
All songs written and composed by Howard Jones.

UK version
Side one
 "Things Can Only Get Better" – 4:02
 "Life in One Day" – 3:39
 "Dream into Action" – 3:45
 "No One Is to Blame" – 3:28 (initial issue), 4:13 (later reissues, single version)
 "Look Mama" – 3:53
 "Assault and Battery" – 4:51
Side two
<li> "Automaton" – 4:04
<li> "Is There a Difference?" – 3:33
<li> "Elegy" – 4:20
<li> "Specialty" – 3:58
<li> "Why Look for the Key" – 3:23
<li> "Hunger for the Flesh" – 3:59
CD bonus tracks
<li> "Bounce Right Back" (B-side of "Like to Get to Know You Well") – 4:33
<li> "Like to Get to Know You Well" – 3:58

US version
Side one
 "Things Can Only Get Better" – 4:02
 "Life in One Day" – 3:39
 "No One Is to Blame" – 3:28
 "Dream Into Action" – 3:45
 "Like to Get to Know You Well" – 4:01
 "Assault and Battery" – 4:51

Side two
<li> "Look Mama" – 3:53
<li> "Bounce Right Back" – 4:34
<li> "Elegy" – 4:20
<li> "Is There a Difference?" – 3:33
<li> "Automaton" – 4:04
<li> "Hunger for the Flesh" – 3:59

Personnel 
 Howard Jones – Lead vocals, electric pianos, synthesizers, electric bass, synth bass, drums, percussion, drum programming
 Martin Jones (Howard's brother) – bass guitar
 Afrodiziak (Claudia Fontaine, Caron Wheeler, Naomi Thompson) – backing vocals
 The Effervescents (Tania Matos, Kirstie Fulthorpe, Laura Bishop, Elizabeth Holden) – backing vocals
 The TKO Horns (Dave Pleurs, Alan Whetton, Jim Patterson, Brian Maurice) – horns
 Helen Liebman – cello on "Elegy"

Production 
 Produced by Rupert Hine for Gestalt
 Recorded and mixed at Farmyard Studios, England by Stephen W. Tayler
 Recording assistant – Andrew Scarth

Other credits
 Album sleeve photography – Simon Fowler
 Graphic design – Rob O'Connor for Stylorouge

Charts

Weekly charts

Year-end charts

Certifications

References

External links
"Dream Into Action" at discogs

Howard Jones (English musician) albums
1985 albums
Albums produced by Rupert Hine
Elektra Records albums
Warner Music Group albums